St Agnes Lifeboat Station  was opened in 1968 and is based in St Agnes, Cornwall, South West England. It is operated by the Royal National Lifeboat Institution (RNLI). The station's lifeboats have been sponsored by BBC's Blue Peter programme, mostly being named Blue Peter IV.

In 1978, and again in 2005, the Duke of Kent visited the station in his role as president of the RNLI.

The station has always been an inshore lifeboat station, and until October 2015 operated a  lifeboat called Blue Peter IV.

The current boat, D-787 XKalibur, was generously funded by The Jaguar Enthusiasts Club and donations from the local and wider community.

Fleet

Awards 
The crew of St Agnes have received the following RNLI awards:
 2 x Framed Letter of Thanks
 6 x Thanks of the Institution Inscribed on Vellum
 2 x Silver Medals

References

External links
 RNLI station information

Lifeboat stations in Cornwall